FK Novaci is a football club based in the village Novaci near Bitola, North Macedonia. They are currently competing in the Macedonian Third League (Southwest Division)

History
The club was founded in 1956.

For many years the club was competing in the Second Macedonian Football League. The club colors are blue and yellow.

Formerly the club was called "Jugotutun".

Current squad
As of 12 February 2018.

References

External links
Club info at MacedonianFootball 
Football Federation of Macedonia 

Novaci
Association football clubs established in 1956
1956 establishments in the Socialist Republic of Macedonia
Novaci Municipality